Shilpa Dayanand Gupta (born 24 February 1989 in Delhi, India) is an Indian cricketer. She plays for Delhi women's cricket team in domestic matches.

Early life
Shilpa Gupta was born in Rohini, Delhi. Her father Dayanand Gupta is a property dealer and her mother Swarna Gupta is a housewife. She did her schooling from SKV Prashant Vihar and attended Kamla Nehru College, Delhi University. She has also pursued her Masters from Himachal Pradesh University.

Professional career
Shilpa Gupta was fond of playing cricket since childhood. Her father has revealed on many occasions that she used to play cricket with her brother on the terrace since childhood. She rose to fame after being selected from the Delhi University team, North Zone team and earning a 175th cap for the India International Women team.

Life after cricket 
Shilpa Gupta left cricket in 2012. In 2013, she was given a government job by Ministry of Defence, Govt of India. She now works as a 
Senior Auditor (Civil) in Indian Air Force, Min of Defence, Delhi.

References

External links 

 cricketarchive

1987 births
Living people
Indian women cricketers
India women One Day International cricketers
Delhi women cricketers
North Zone women cricketers
People from Delhi